A saildrive is a transmission system for a boat whose inboard engine has a horizontal output shaft.  The saildrive's input shaft is therefore also horizontal.  That input shaft is geared so as to drive a vertical intermediate shaft extending downward through the hull.  The intermediate shaft is then geared so as to drive a horizontal propeller shaft mounted on a skeg outside the hull.

The transitions from horizontal to vertical and then back to horizontal can be seen as a Z shape, and saildrives are indeed similar to the Z-drive transmissions used on larger vessels.  The difference between a saildrive and a Z-drive is that a saildrive's propeller shaft is fixed in place, pointing aft, whereas a Z-drive's propeller shaft can be rotated to any azimuth.

Traditional sailboat transmissions consist of a simple horizontal output shaft extended rearward from the engine, through the stern via a stuffing box.  The saildrive has several advantages over the traditional sailboat transmission: smaller horizontal size, no stuffing box to maintain, and the propeller is mounted horizontally instead of at a downward angle.

Saildrive also reduces propeller walk, reduces vibration, and is more efficient.

History of the saildrive

Among the earliest representatives of the technology was the OMC Zephyr Saildrive, produced from 1977 to 1984.  This was a two-stroke gasoline engine to which oil needed to be added on a 50:1 mixture.   It was a derated version of the 32 cubic inch engine block used at that time on the OMC Evinrude 25/30/35 hp outboards.

See also

References 

Marine propulsion